This is a list of electoral results for the electoral district of Warrenheip and Grenville in Victorian state elections.

Members for Warrenheip and Grenville

Election results

Elections in the 1940s

 Two candidate preferred vote was estimated.

Elections in the 1930s

Elections in the 1920s

References

Victoria (Australia) state electoral results by district